The E-flat alto sarrusophone is the alto member of the sarrusophone family of metal double reed instruments. Its body is folded only once, and has a bocal that resembles the neck of a tenor saxophone.

Historically it was built in the late 19th and early 20th centuries principally by its inventor Gautrot and his successor Couesnon & Co., as well as Evette & Schaeffer (now Buffet Crampon) and Orsi of Milan. It is currently only available by custom order, from Orsi or the German instrument maker Benedikt Eppelsheim.

References

See also 
Sarrusophone

Single oboes with conical bore
Sarrusophones